The Aspetuck Land Trust is a nonprofit organization founded in 1967 that seeks to preserves open spaces in the towns of Westport, Fairfield, Weston and Easton in Fairfield County, Connecticut. In 2011 it was reported that the trust covered an area of 1,700 acres over 43 sites which include public trails.

History
In 2011 Joan duPont donated 34 acres owned since 1982.

In 2011 the trust acquired the Trout Brook Valley lands in Easton. Paul Newman is recognized as responsible for lobbying the Connecticut governor for assisting with the funds for the purchase. Part of this land is a state park known as Trout Brook Valley State Park Reserve.

Reception
In 2010 it was reported that the trust had preserved hiking trails arounds the Saugatuck river.

Protected areas

Lee's Canal Wetlands Habitat, Westport

Newman Poses Nature Preserve, Westport

Taylortown Salt Marsh, Westport

Trout Brook Valley Preserve, Easton

References

External links

 Official websiteAspetuckLandTrust.org

Land trusts in Connecticut
Protected areas of Fairfield County, Connecticut